The tomb of Timur Shah Durrani (Maqbara-i-Timur Shah) is located in Kabul and was built in 1815. It is the mausoleum of Timur Shah Durrani, who was the second ruler of the Durrani Empire, from 1772–1793. In 1776 Timur Shah chose Kabul as the capital of Afghanistan, which was Kandahar until then. Although he died in 1793 in Char Bagh, it wasn't until years later that the tomb was built. Timur Shah was later buried in here. 

The mausoleum was heavily damaged during the Afghan Civil War. The building and its gardens were fully restored with the aid of the Aga Khan Development Network in 2012. On 19 October 2012, Hamed Karzai, president at the time re-opened the mausoleum.

See also 
 Tomb of Ahmad Shah Durrani

References

External links
 Old image of the tomb

Buildings and structures in Kabul
Burial sites of the Durrani dynasty